A corniche is a road on the side of a cliff or mountain, with the ground rising on one side and falling away on the other. The word has been absorbed into English from the French term  or "road on a ledge", itself derived from the Italian , for "ledge".

Europe

France
Three famed corniche roads of the Côte d'Azur in the French Riviera run between the sea and mountains from Nice eastward toward Menton.
 along the upper cliffs.

The  passes through the principality of Monaco.  The  featured prominently in the Alfred Hitchcock film To Catch a Thief.

Italy
The Amalfi Drive, along the Amalfi Coast south of Naples, is a road carved into the cliffs along the Mediterranean Sea, and can be classified as a corniche. It runs between Sorrento and Amalfi and was originally built by the Romans.

Africa

Senegal
The coastal road facing the Atlantic Ocean in the capital city of Dakar is called the Corniche Ouest and runs along a cliff above the beaches and rocky shores.

South Africa
Many of the roads running around the Cape Peninsular, south of Cape Town, have been constructed in the form of corniches. A good example is part of Victoria Road running through the suburbs of Clifton and Bantry Bay.

Libya
The Tripoli Corniche, also known as Al-Fatah Street, runs along the Mediterranean from the Waddan Bridge to the roundabout at Tripoli's sea port entrance.

Egypt
Any waterfront passage along a body of water is classed as a corniche in Egypt. Most Nile valley and Delta cities overlooking the 1000km river course and two branches in the country have one or two corniche streets (east and/or west banks). For example "Corniche Giza" and "Corniche Cairo", the longest Egyptian corniche. Other cities such as Mansoura, Damietta and Luxor also have corniches.

 The 18km Corniche al-Nil Street (Arabic: شارع كورنيش النيل) promenade in Cairo (east bank of the Nile) runs from the Maadi district in the south, to the mouth of the Ismailia Canal in al-Sahel district in the north. Building numbers take on one to two digits in Maadi where numbering starts, where for example the Holiday Inn hotel is 29 A Corniche al-Nile, and up to four digits in the northern half due to it length, where the Ramses Hilton hotel's address in Bulaq is 1115 Corniche al-Nil. The street colloquially takes on the names of some of the districts and neighbourhoods it passes through such as the Maadi Corniche, and Corniche Masr al-Qadima (Old Cairo).
 The promenade that runs from the Giza Zoo to the balloon theater in Agouza is colloquially known as the Giza Corniche.
 The promenade running from Montazah Palace walls to the Qaitbay Citadel in Alexandria is known as Corniche (Alexandria)

Though the word itself comes from French, the Egyptian usage has led neighboring Arab countries, which are not francophone and have no French influence, to adopt the word. These include Sudan, Saudi Arabia, the UAE and Qatar.

Middle East

Lebanon
The avenue that runs along the western and northern coast of the Beirut peninsula is colloquially called Corniche Beirut.

Oman
The promenade along the waterfront in Muttrah, Muscat, is known as The Corniche.

Qatar
The promenade that runs for several kilometers along the Doha Bay of Doha is colloquially called Doha Corniche.

United Arab Emirates
 The promenade that runs from the Emirates Palace hotel to the fish market in Abu Dhabi is colloquially called the Corniche.
in Ajman, the corniche is the road that runs from ajman beach to ajman marina, with the beautiful skyline of the city and the tall skyscrapers thar stand along the road.
 In Sharjah, the road surrounding Khalid Lagoon is known as Buheira Corniche, though not a true corniche as it is near sea level and not following a cliff line. 
 Several other waterfront roads and promenades in the Emirates are also referred to as Corniche, including the Deira Corniche, Fujairah Corniche, and the Jumeirah Corniche.

Saudi Arabia

Dammam corniche, Qatif corniche, Khobar corniche, Ras Tanura corniche, Jeddah Corniche, Yanbu corniche, Al Jubail corniche, Khafji corniche.

Southeast Asia

Philippines
Manila Bay, Manila, Philippines
Lamon Bay, Quezon Province, Philippines

India

Marine Drive, Mumbai

References

External links
 

Types of roads

fr:Corniche (homonymie)